Dalmo Inácio da Silva or simply Dalmo (born February 18, 1984) is a Brazilian footballer who currently plays for Cerâmica.

Career
Dalmo was invited by Bulgarian side Chernomorets Burgas to join a trial period, which began in February 2010. During the winter camp in Antalya he scored a goal in a friendly match against FC Winterthur. On February 18, 2010, Dalmo signed a two years contract with the club. Shortly after he was released.

References

External links

1984 births
Living people
Brazilian footballers
Cruzeiro Esporte Clube players
Goiás Esporte Clube players
Czech First League players
FC Zbrojovka Brno players
PFC Chernomorets Burgas players
First Professional Football League (Bulgaria) players
Expatriate footballers in Bulgaria
Association football forwards